Khejroli is a village and a village panchayat in Jaipur district, Rajasthan located 45 km away from its Jaipur and 8 km away from Great Bilanderpur village panchayat. It consists of approximately 25 temples. This is one of the big villages in Jaipur district, it consists of 40 wards of panchayat.

Demographics
 India census, Khejroli had total population of 16,531 people which consists of 8,562 males and 7,969 females. Among the population 9,924 (60%) people are educated consisting of 6,094 males and 3,830 females. In Khejroli, 16% of the population is under 6 years of age.

References

External links
[https://web.archive.org/web/20150901194720/

Villages in Jaipur district